The 1972–73 Illinois Fighting Illini men's basketball team represented the University of Illinois.

Regular season

Head coach Harv Schmidt entered his sixth season with the Fighting Illini with high expectations.  The 1971-72 team returned one of the top senior athletes in the country, Nick Weatherspoon.  As a sophomore, Weatherspoon scored 381 points, averaging 16.5 points per game, while collecting 246 rebounds. His junior year was even better, scoring 500 total points, averaging 20.8 points and pulling down 262 rebounds.  Nothing, however, would be better than Weatherspoon's senior year.  During this season he would score 600 points, averaging 25.0 points per game, while amassing 295 total rebounds.  Weatherspoon remains as number 11 on the all-time leading scores list at the University of Illinois, only surpassed by players that completed four years of varsity basketball.  His three year average of 20.9 points per game and 11.3 rebounds per game still remain number one for the Fighting Illini.

The 1972-73 team's starting lineup included Weatherspoon and Rick Schmidt at the forward spots, Jeff Dawson and Otho Tucker as guards and Nick Conner at center. The roster included the teams first 7 foot tall player, Bill Rucks a freshman from Waukegan High School.

Roster

Source

Schedule
																																																
Source																																																																																																
																																																
|-																																																
!colspan=12 style="background:#DF4E38; color:white;"| Non-Conference regular season
	
	
	
	
	
	

|-
!colspan=9 style="background:#DF4E38; color:#FFFFFF;"|Big Ten regular season

	
|-

Player stats

Awards and honors
Nick Weatherspoon
1st Team All-American (Helms), Honorable Mention (Converse)
Team Most Valuable Player

Team players drafted into the NBA

Rankings

References

Illinois Fighting Illini
Illinois Fighting Illini men's basketball seasons
1972 in sports in Illinois
1973 in sports in Illinois